Gwalior West is a development project under National Capital Region. It was started in 1992 to attract the population of Delhi. Gwalior was first city out of 5 Counter Magnets selected by the government. Gwalior West lies 15 km from Gwalior and 8 km east of the Tigra Dam.

Special  Area  Development  Authority
The Special  Area  Development  Authority (SADA) was created by Madhya Pradesh government to implement the counter magnet project of the National Capital Region (NCR) in Madhya Pradesh. The chairman of its board is a political nominee. Its funding comes from the NCR Planning Board and the Madhya Pradesh government. The chief task of the SADA was to develop Gwalior West.

SADA was in April 2000 given jurisdiction over 28,102 hectares of Gwalior district, and 1,912 hectares of Morena district, totalling 30,014 hectares and 36 villages. The  entire region was Master planned by a firm called DKS Consultants who further gave the planning and engineering works to Rishi Dev Architects and Associates. They successfully completed the planning of the major phases of the project in 2006.  The area is bounded to the West by the Tigra reservoir and Sank river, and to the East by the AH47 (previously the NH3). The ground is considered to be poor quality for agriculture, therefore suitable for urbanization.

SADA was criticized in 2010 for inefficient budgeting, and for failing to produce a balance sheet.

Developments
Gwalior West consists of many housing projects, government offices, Institutions and sports complexes. Sahara City Homes, Mantri City, NG Developers.

Gwalior International Cricket Stadium
Gwalior International Cricket Stadium is the major project which is under construction in Gwalior west. It is a mega stadium with 60,000 capacity and will be 3rd largest cricket stadium in the world after its completion.

Gwalior Metro
The proposed Gwalior Metro is expected to connect Gwalior West to provide hassle free connectivity to the Gwalior city.

Transport
Rayaru is the nearest railway station and The proposed Broadguage track of Gwalior-Sheopur Narrow Gauge train will pass through Gwalior West and also it is said that one railway station is to be built in Gwalior West as well.

References

External links 
 Official Website of Gwalior
 Gwalior Municipal Corporation
 Gwalior Information Centre
 Under Construction Website of Gwalior city

Gwalior
Cities in Madhya Pradesh